Henry Bingham  was an Irish politician.

Bingham was educated at Trinity College, Dublin. He sat in the Irish House of Commons from 1750 to 1768 as a Member of Parliament (MP) in the Irish House of Commons for Tuam in County Galway

References

Alumni of Trinity College Dublin
Members of the Parliament of Ireland (pre-1801) for County Galway constituencies
Irish MPs 1727–1760
Irish MPs 1761–1768